Syracuse University Project Advance (SUPA) is an educational program that provides high school students with the opportunity to take Syracuse University courses in their own schools during the regularly scheduled school day.  After successful completion of the course(s) they can request to transfer the credits they earn into the colleges/universities they attend after high school. This is an example of a Concurrent Enrollment Program or Partnership (CEP).

Project Advance (PA) was formed in 1972 to provide more challenging options to college-bound junior and senior level students in local Syracuse high schools. By the time students reached their senior year, many had completed almost all of their requirements for graduation and needed a challenge to keep them motivated. This phenomenon was termed senioritis or senior slump and led to a culture that focused on admission to college instead of high school as preparation for completing college.

Today, SUPA serves more than 200 high schools in New York, New Jersey, Maine, Massachusetts, Michigan, and Rhode Island, with the largest concentration in New York State. Approximately 9,000 students enroll annually in SU courses through Project Advance, taught by more than 878 high school faculty members with SU adjunct instructor appointments. Teachers continue to attend professional development training sessions at the annual SUPA Summer Institute as more and more high schools expand their academic offerings. The course selection has also grown to include more than 30 courses from 24 academic disciplines. Project Advance, however, is not a profit center or a recruiting tool for SU.

Student participants can take SU university courses at a reduced tuition rate at their own high schools with the courses taught by high school teachers who are trained and supervised by SU faculty. The high school teachers who serve as instructors must meet certain standards in order to qualify for and continue teaching these classes for the university.  They can earn graduate credit for the initial training as well as towards continuing education and professional development requirements.

Students enroll in the courses through their local school system. Those interested in receiving Syracuse University credit complete an online application/registration form and pay per credit ($115.00 as of the 2020/21 academic year). The courses are listed on the student's Syracuse University transcript by the title of the class and are not identified as SUPA classes. However, they also appear on the student's high school transcript where they are identified as SUPA courses. The extent to which colleges accept the credits varies by college. Many competitive colleges will not award credit if courses appear on the high school transcript and particularly if the courses either earned high school credit or were used to fulfill high school requirements. This contrasts to credit that is usually awarded for top scores on Advanced Placement Tests administered by the College Boards.

University faculty read papers, review tests, and visit each class during the semester to ensure that the grading standards applied are consistent with those applied in the same courses on campus. These features plus the research that is done on the program each year, mean that PA meets the standards developed by the National Alliance of Concurrent Enrollment Partnerships (NACEP), an organization designed by and for CEP personnel to (through accreditation) reassure accepting institutions that credits earned through the CEP meet specific quality standards.

History
In 1972 six Central New York high school administrators approached Syracuse University about establishing a college readiness program to challenge high school seniors.

The administrators hoped to address growing concerns about “senioritis”—the tendency of college-bound seniors to not take their final year seriously because of a lack of incentive. Having completed their graduation requirements early, these students would use their senior year to relax and socialize rather than readying themselves for the transition from high school to college-level work.

A working model
To solve the problem presented by the school superintendents, SU administrators explored ways in which carefully designed and controlled “concurrent enrollment” (sometimes called “dual enrollment”) courses could be taught for credit within the high school as part of the regular academic program. A committee of deans, academic chairmen, and faculty discussed multiple solutions before proposing a college readiness program that would be self-sufficient and capable of implementation and expansion without creating a financial burden for the university or an instructional overload for cooperating faculty.

The model was designed to best utilize existing resources—the college courses would be taught by trained high school teachers as part of their regular teaching load. This would ensure that the courses could be taught during the regular school day, so as to not negatively impact students’ schedules.

New standards
Early in the design process three major factors became apparent:
First, that while an effort would be made to utilize individual high school resources, individual concurrent enrollment courses would—based on their content and structure—involve different formats and require new relationships between SU faculty, high school faculty, and students;
Second, the success of the project would depend on the quality of the concurrent enrollment courses themselves;
Third, the courses taught in the high schools would not only have the same instructional goals as their counterparts on campus but they would have identical criteria for awarding grades.

Teaching the teachers
The high school-university partnership was formalized as SU Project Advance (SUPA) and launched its first dual enrollment course, English 101, in the fall semester of 1972-73. Following a detailed evaluation and development process, four additional courses were selected for possible inclusion in SUPA. These included introductory psychology, study of religion (human values), mass communications, and perspectives on drugs.

In preparation for the initial introduction of concurrent enrollment courses in the high schools, summer training sessions were held in each of the five content areas to prepare high school teachers to teach the college-level courses. These training sessions were taught by university professors and were designed to familiarize the high school teachers with the rationale and content of the new courses, the instructional techniques, and the individualized materials, as well as offer them opportunities to explore methods of adapting them to high school use if changes seemed necessary.

Taking it to the schools
Field-tested in the 1973-74 academic year in nine schools, the project expanded in 1974-75 to more than 40 schools and 180 teachers from Long Island to Buffalo, with an enrollment of more than 2,000 students. As more educators, students, and parents realized the value of college readiness and of taking actual college courses before leaving high school, the program grew.

Today, SUPA serves more than 200 high schools in New York, New Jersey, Maine, Massachusetts, Michigan, and Rhode Island, with the largest concentration in New York State. Approximately 9,000 students enroll annually in SU courses, taught by more than 878 high school faculty members with SU adjunct instructor appointments. Teachers continue to attend professional development training sessions at the annual SUPA Summer Institute as more and more high schools expand their academic offerings. The course selection has also grown to include more than 30 courses from 24 academic disciplines.

Modeling success
SUPA is the only program affiliated with a private research university in the Northeast to be accredited by the National Alliance of Concurrent Enrollment Partnerships (NACEP). SUPA is also a founding member of NACEP, which serves as a national accrediting body and supports all members by providing standards of excellence, research, communication, and advocacy.

Timeline
1972: Six local high schools approach Syracuse University about devising a program to offer college courses to qualified high school seniors.
1973: SU Project Advance is field-tested in nine schools.
1974: SU Project Advance officially launches, offering SU courses in more than 40 high schools.
1984: The American Association of Higher Education recognizes SU Project Advance for notable achievements in education.
2002: New York State Assembly passes a resolution recognizing SU Project Advance for "...the significance of its contributions to the quality and diversity of educational opportunities in the State of New York."
2003: SU Project Advance becomes one of a select few private four-year universities accredited by the National Alliance of Concurrent Enrollment Partnerships (NACEP).
2010: A 35-year retrospective of SUPA’s research, Our Courses Your Classroom: Research on Syracuse University Courses Taught in High School is published.

Courses 

Courses offered:
 Accounting
 American History
 Biology
 Calculus
 Chemistry
 College Learning Strategies
 Computer Engineering
 Cybersecurity
 Earth System Science
 Economics
 English/Writing
 Forensic Science
 French
 Information Technology
 Italian
 Latin
 Personal Finance
 Physics
 Presentational Speaking
 Psychology
 Public Affairs
 Spanish
 Sociology
 Statistics
 Website Design

References

External links
 NACEP Website
 SUPA Website

United States educational programs